Lacinato kale or, in Italian and often in English,  (literally "black cabbage") is a variety of kale with a long tradition in Italian cuisine, especially that of Tuscany. It is also known as Tuscan kale, Italian kale, dinosaur kale,  kale, flat back kale, palm tree kale, or black Tuscan palm. Lacinato kale has been grown in Tuscany for centuries, and is one of the traditional ingredients of minestrone and ribollita.

Description
The lacinato variety is sometimes called dinosaur kale because its bumpy leaves may resemble what dinosaur skin looked like, and perhaps because the unique appearance of the leaves is evocative of primordial flora. Because of its taste, it has been called "the darling of the culinary world".

Preparation and dishes
Lacinato kale, like most other kale varieties, is usually blanched first, and then sautéed with other, flavourful ingredients; in Campanian cuisine, anchovies are often added. It is commonly used in pastas and soups, but can also be eaten raw, in a salad.

In Tuscan cuisine, lacinato kale is often used in ribollita (literally: "reboiled"), a thick, hearty soup made up of ingredients cooked for a meal the day before.

Cultivation
Lacinato kale dates to the 18th century in Italy. This cultivar is popular among gardeners because of its colour and texture, and was amongst the plants Thomas Jefferson recorded in his 1777 garden at Monticello. The straplike leaves are typically harvested from the bottom of the stem, leaving the remainder of the plant resembling a palm tree.

References

Brassica oleracea
Leaf vegetables